Rose Marie (1923–2017) was an American actress.

Rose Marie or Rose-Marie may also refer to:

 Rose-Marie, an operetta by Rudolph Friml
 Rose-Marie (1928 film), a silent film starring Joan Crawford
 Rose Marie (1936 film), a black-and-white musical starring Jeanette MacDonald and Nelson Eddy
 Rose Marie (1954 film), a color musical starring Ann Blyth, Howard Keel and Fernando Lamas
 "Rose Marie" (song), the title song, which became a hit in 1955 for Slim Whitman
 Rose-Marie (singer) (born 1956), Northern Irish singer, actress, and television personality
 Rose-Marie Carlsson (born 1954), Swedish politician
 Dr Rose Marie, a character in A Very Peculiar Practice

See also 

 Rosemary (disambiguation)
 Marie Rose (disambiguation)